Marmong Point is a suburb of the City of Lake Macquarie in New South Wales, Australia north-north-east of the town of Toronto on the western shore of Lake Macquarie. Marmong is an Aboriginal word meaning low water or swampy water.

History 
The Aboriginal people, in this area, the Awabakal, were the first people of this land.

Early industry included a market garden, a sawmill, and an abattoirs.

References

External links
 History of Marmong Point (Lake Macquarie City Library)

Suburbs of Lake Macquarie